Hendrick Bogaert (1630–1675) was a Dutch Golden Age painter.

Biography
He was born in Amsterdam. According to the RKD he is known for genre works featuring farm scenes, and was the teacher of Joseph Mulder in 1672. Houbraken said Bogaert died in the Rotterdam "Gasthuis", or hospice, because he never saved money for his own old age. He lived life day-to-day, and was said to respond to friendly admonitions to think of his future for fear of landing in the gasthuis, with the comment "What's wrong with the hospice? Is it for Pigs?". Houbraken placed Bogaert's biography as a "bridge between the odor of brandywine coming from the painter Abraham Diepraam and the smell of poop from the engraver Joseph Mulder, who was his pupil".

According to the RKD, Bogaert died in Amsterdam, not Rotterdam, at some period between 1675 and 1695.

See also
Dutch Golden Age painting

References

Hendrick Bogaert on Artnet

1630 births
1675 deaths
Dutch Golden Age painters
Dutch male painters
Painters from Amsterdam